Ithycythara apicodenticulata is a species of sea snail, a marine gastropod mollusk in the family Mangeliidae.

Description

Distribution
This marine species occurs in the western part of the Gulf of Thailand.

References

 Robba E., Di Geronimo I., Chaimanee N., Pietro Negri M. & Sanfilippo R. 2007. Holocene and Recent shallow soft-bottom mollusks from the Western Gulf of Thailand: Pak Phanang Bay and additions to Phetchaburi fauna. Bollettino Malacologico 42 (supplement 6): 1–98
 Bouchet, P.; Fontaine, B. (2009). List of new marine species described between 2002-2006. Census of Marine Life.

External links

apicodenticulata
Gastropods described in 2007